Unforgettable... with Love, also known as simply Unforgettable, is the thirteenth studio album by American singer Natalie Cole. Released on June 11, 1991, the album includes covers of standards previously performed by her father, Nat King Cole. It was also her debut for Elektra Records, after being given her release from EMI Records.

Background
The record was very successful in the pop, jazz, and R&B markets and was considered the major comeback recording that had been brewing since Cole's late 1980s releases. The album was certified 7× platinum as of 2009 by the RIAA. The album won the 1992 Grammy Awards for Album of the Year and Best Engineered – Non-Classical, while the track "Unforgettable" (duet with her father Nat King Cole) won three additional Grammys: Record of the Year, Traditional Pop Vocal Performance, and Arrangement Accompanying Vocals. The album also won Soul Train Music Award for Best R&B/Soul Album, Female the same year.

Two albums prior to this one (1987's Everlasting and 1989's Good to Be Back) also moved to Elektra after Cole signed with the label. Her uncle Ike Cole plays piano on the album.

As of 2016 the album has sold 6.2 million copies in the United States according to Nielsen Music.

Track listing

Personnel
Adapted from AllMusic.

 Murray Adler – violin
 Anas Alaf – assistant engineer, engineer
 Monty Alexander – piano
 Israel Baker – violin
 Marilyn Baker – violin
 Rick Baptist – trumpet
 Kevin Becka – assistant engineer, engineer
 Arnold Belnick – violin
 Pete Beltran – trombone
 Dixie Blackstone – violin
 Ray Blair – assistant engineer, engineer
 Samuel Boghossian – viola
 George Bohanon – trombone
 Tom Boyd – oboe
 Jacqueline Brand – violin
 Oscar Brashear – trumpet
 Alan Broadbent – celeste, piano
 Ray Brown – arranger, bass
 Terry Brown – assistant engineer, engineer
 John Bruno – assistant engineer, engineer
 Dennis Budimir – guitar
 Denyse Buffum – viola
 Larry Bunker – percussion
 Jodi Burnett – cello
 Ralph Burns – arranger
 Kenneth Burward-hoy – viola
 Darius Campo – violin
 Conte Candoli – trumpet
 Stuart Canin – violin
 Maurice Cevrero – copyist
 Lily Ho Chen – violin
 John Chiodini – guitar
 Pete Christlieb – tenor saxophone, saxophone, woodwind
 Gene Cipriano – oboe, woodwind
 John Clayton – bass, string bass
 Pat Coil – synthesizer
 Brad Cole – piano
 Ike Cole – piano
 Natalie Cole – arranger, vocal arrangement, vocals
 John Collins – guitar
 Antony Cooke – cello
 Ronald Cooper – cello
 Jim Cowger – copyist
 Gail Cruz – violin
 Peter Darmi – engineer
 Isabelle Daskoff – violin
 Donna Davidson – background vocals
 Charlie Davis – trumpet
 Vincent DeRosa – French horn
 Chuck Domanico – bass, string bass
 Bonnie Douglas – violin
 Assa Drori – violin
 David Duke – French horn
 Bruce Dukov – violin
 Bob Efford – baritone saxophone
 Stephen Erdody – cello
 Joseph Estren – copyist
 Pavel Farkas – violin
 Henry Ferber – violin
 Michael Ferril – violin
 Elizabeth Finch – copyist
 Chuck Findley – trumpet
 André Fischer – arranger, producer
 Clare Fischer – arranger, piano, rhythm arrangements
 Ronald Folsom – violin
 David Foster – producer
 Gary Foster – flute, alto saxophone, woodwind
 William Francis – copyist
 Jack Furlong – copyist
 Armen Garabedian – violin
 Berj Garabedian – violin
 Tom Garvin – synthesizer
 James Getzoff – violin
 Julie Gigante – violin
 Harris Goldman – violin
 Pamela Goldsmith – viola
 Ron Gorow – copyist
 Endre Granat – violin
 Gary Grant – trumpet
 Thurman Green – trombone
 Susan Greenberg – flute
 Ralph Grierson – synthesizer
 Sol Gubin – drums
 Debbie Hall – background vocals
 Larry Hall – trumpet
 Diana Halprin – violin
 Jeff Hamilton – drums
 Clayton Haslop – violin
 Fred Hayman – clothing/wardrobe, wardrobe
 Dan Higgins – alto saxophone, soprano saxophone
 Paula Hochhalter – cello
 Bill Holman – arranger
 Steve Huffsteter – trumpet
 Jim Hughart – bass
 Bill Hughes – copyist
 George Hurrell – photography
 John Johnson – tuba
 John Thomas Johnson – tuba
 Marilyn L. Johnson – French horn
 Thomas "Snake" Johnson – trombone
 Harold Jones – drums
 Jeffrey Jones – copyist
 Karen Jones – violin
 Jerry Jordan – assistant engineer, engineer
 Nathan Kaproff – violin
 Anne Karam – cello
 Dennis Karmazyn – cello
 Armand Karpoff – cello
 Suzie Katayama – copyist
 Roland Kato – viola
 Kerry Katz – background vocals
 Randy Kerber – synthesizer
 Myra Kestenbaum – viola
 Katie Kirkpatrick – harp
 Ezra Kliger – violin
 Armen Ksadjikian – cello
 Steve Kujala – woodwind
 Bernard Kundell – violin
 Michael Lang – piano
 Ronnie Lang – woodwind
 Ronald Langinger – flute
 Tim Lauber – assistant engineer, engineer
 Michel Legrand – arranger, orchestral arrangements
 Pierre Leloup – linguist
 Kathleen Lenski – violin
 Brian Leonard – violin
 Gayle Levant – harp
 Berwyn Linton – copyist
 Tommy LiPuma – producer, rhythm arrangements
 Rich Logan – background vocals
 Randy Long – assistant engineer, engineer
 Charles Loper – trombone
 Warren Luening – trumpet
 Arthur Maebe – French horn
 Johnny Mandel – adaptation, arranger, orchestral arrangements
 Rene Mandel – violin
 Edith Markman – violin
 Michael Markman – violin
 Margaret Maryatt – copyist
 Yoko Matsuda – violin
 Donald McInnes – viola
 Mike Melvoin – piano
 Don Menza – tenor saxophone
 Gene Merlino – background vocals
 Dwight Mikkelsen – copyist
 Deborah Mitchell – copyist
 Richard Mitchell – tenor saxophone
 Rick Mitchell – tenor saxophone
 Lanny Morgan – alto saxophone
 Ralph Morrison III – violin
 Carole Mukogawa – viola
 Richard Taylor "Dick" Nash – trombone
 Buell Neidlinger – string bass
 Dan Neufeld – viola
 Irma Neumann – violin
 David "Fathead" Newman – guest artist, tenor saxophone
 Jack Nimitz – baritone saxophone, woodwind
 Mike Nowack – viola
 Brian O'Connor – French horn
 Nils Oliver – cello
 Sid Page – violin
 Marty Paich – arranger, orchestral arrangements, rhythm arrangements
 Cecille Parker – stylist
 Doyle Partners – design
 John Patitucci – bass
 Bruce Paulson – trombone
 Bill Perkins – alto saxophone
 John Pisano – guitar
 Kazi Pitelka – viola
 Stanley Plummer – violin
 Barbara Porter – violin
 Tara Posey – make-up
 Jack Redmond – trombone
 Bill Reichenbach Jr. – trombone
 Dave Reitzas – assistant engineer, engineer, mixing, mixing assistant
 Dorothy Remsen – harp
 Chris Rich – assistant engineer, engineer
 Nelson Riddle – arranger
 Marnie Riley – assistant engineer, engineer
 Rail Jon Rogut – assistant engineer, engineer
 Anatoly Rosinsky – violin
 Daniel Rothmuller – cello
 Doug Saks – mastering
 Joe Sample – guest artist, piano
 Myron Sandler – viola
 Al Schmitt – engineer, mixing
 Frederick Seykora – cello
 Sid Sharp – violin
 Don Shelton – background vocals
 Harry Shirinian – viola
 Haim Shtrum – violin
 Paul Shure – violin
 Andrew Simpkins – bass
 Nolan Andrew Smith – trumpet
 Valerie Smith – linguist
 Armin Steiner – engineer
 Sally Stevens – background vocals
 Susan Stevens – background vocals
 David Stockhammer – viola
 Sheridon Stokes – woodwind
 Robert Stone – string bass
 Margaret Storer – string bass
 Shari Sutcliffe – project coordinator
 Frank Szabo – trumpet
 James Thatcher – French horn
 Milton Thomas – viola
 Raymond Tischer – viola, violin
 Richard Todd – French horn
 Roy Trakin – liner notes
 Alexander Treger – violin
 Bob Tricarico – baritone saxophone
 Mari Tsumura-botnick – violin
 Louise di Tullio – flute, woodwind
 Jo Ann Turovsky – harp
 Alan de Veritch – viola
 Gerald Vinci – violin
 Al Viola – guitar
 Dorothy Wade – violin
 Brad Wanaar – French horn
 Miwako Watanabe – violin
 Dave Weckl – drums
 Michelle Winding – assistant, assistant producer
 Rick Winquest – assistant engineer, engineer
 Joey Wolpert – engineer
 Jeffrey "Woody" Woodruff – engineer
 Woody Woodruff – engineer
 Ken Yerke – violin
 Janet Zeitoun – hair stylist

Charts

Weekly charts

Year-end charts

Decade-end charts

Certifications and sales

References

1991 albums
Natalie Cole albums
Albums produced by Tommy LiPuma
Albums produced by David Foster
Elektra Records albums
Grammy Award for Album of the Year
Nat King Cole tribute albums
Traditional pop albums
Grammy Award for Best Engineered Album, Non-Classical